Nebraska City Municipal Airport  is four miles south of Nebraska City, in Otoe County, Nebraska.

The airport was built as a replacement for Grundman Field and opened in 1994. Located inside the city limits Grundman Field could not lengthen the runway to allow business jets. In 1974 when then Mayor A. O. Gigstard created the airport authority to build Nebraska City Municipal the voters had him recalled and removed from office. He returned as mayor in 1980 as a write-in candidate. Later the new airport was approved by the voters as a bond measure.

Most U.S. airports use the same three-letter location identifier for the FAA and IATA, but Nebraska City Municipal is AFK to the FAA and has no IATA code.

Facilities
In the year ending July 7, 2005 the airport had 5,300 aircraft operations, average 14 per day: 93% general aviation and 7% military.

References

External links 
Grundman Field at Abandoned Airfields

Airports in Nebraska
Buildings and structures in Otoe County, Nebraska